Johnny Q. Public (sometimes stylized as johnny Q. public) was a Christian alternative rock band from Springfield, Missouri. Although their sound was wholly modern, it was influenced by bands such as Led Zeppelin and Cream. In addition to their music they were known for their Charismatic theology, which they would dramatically display through audience participation at their live shows.

Background
When Johnny Q. Public signed to Gotee Records, its members were between the ages of fifteen and twenty-three. Their signing came after producing a demo with Steve Griffith. Their debut record, Extra*Ordinary, was released in 1995 and garnered the band mainstream distribution through Elektra Records Dan Fritz would later refer to the period after releasing Extra*Ordinary as a "whirlwind of craziness". Their song "Body Be" gained them national exposure when its video got picked up by MTV. They toured for three years before being able to pursue a second album, and during that time the band experienced some personnel changes. Around 1998 guitarist Oran Thornton married Christian artist Miss Angie, sister of guitarist Shawn Turner, and moved on to a band called Flick. Drummer Brian DuVall also left and was replaced by Nate McCorkle, former drummer for Morella's Forest.

Their follow-up record, Welcome to Earth, was released by both Gotee and Roadrunner records. Its sound shifted toward pop with hints of hard rock. HM magazine likened it to the Newsboys, stating that the band could easily receive radio play in both Christian and mainstream markets. In support they toured with Bleach and Skillet.

Johnny Q. Public broke up in mid 2001.

Discography
1995: Extra*Ordinary
2000: Welcome to Earth

Members
Dan Fritz - vocals (1995-2001)
Shawn Turner - guitar (1995-2001)
Nathan McCorkle - drums (1998-2001)
Brad Barnerd - guitar (1996-2000)
Ken Bassham - bass (1995-1996)
Brian DuVall - drums (1995-1998)
Oran Thornton - guitar (1995-1996)
Shawn Brock - bass (1996-2000)

References

American Christian rock groups
Musical groups established in 1995
Gotee Records artists